Anne Mahlum (born November 3, 1980) is an American entrepreneur based in Washington, DC. She is the founder and CEO of Solidcore, a fitness company, which owns 72 gyms. She is also the founder of Back on My Feet (BoMF), an independent organization for homeless people.

Education and career 
Originally from Bismarck, North Dakota, Mahlum has a dual BS degree in Political Science and Government & Public Relations from St. Cloud State University and a MA degree in Political Communication from American University.

After graduation, Mahlum started her career as policy analyst at the Association of Research Libraries on Dupont Circle. In May 2007, she launched Back on My Feet, a Philadelphia-based non-profit organization for homeless people. The organization has chapters in Baltimore, Washington D.C., Boston, Chicago, Dallas, Indianapolis, Atlanta, New York City, Austin and Los Angeles. She left the non-profit in July 2013.

In 2012, Mahlum hosted a documentary for MTV on youth homelessness. Since 2013 she is the owner and CEO of Solidcore, a boutique fitness company founded in Washington DC. In late 2017, the company raised funds from Peterson Partners, a private equity firm in Salt Lake City, to increase the number of locations in North America.

Recognition 
Mahlum has been named ABC World News Person of the Week, a 2008 CNN Hero, 40 under 40 individual by Philadelphia and Washington DC's Business Journal. She is also a recipient of 2012 Brava Award by CEO Magazine.

In August 2020, Mahlum was accused of creating a toxic and abusive culture at Solidcore, as well as violating COVID-19 restrictions.

References

External links 

1980 births
Living people
St. Cloud State University alumni
American University alumni
People from Bismarck, North Dakota